Canelas may refer to the following places:

Mexico
 Canelas, Durango, a municipality in the state of Durango

Portugal
 Canelas (Arouca), a civil parish in the municipality of Arouca
 Canelas (Estarreja), a civil parish in the municipality of Estarreja
 Canelas (Penafiel), a civil parish in the municipality of Penafiel
 Canelas (Peso da Régua), a civil parish in the municipality of Peso da Régua
 Canelas, Vila Nova de Gaia, a civil parish in the municipality of Vila Nova de Gaia

Spain
 Canelas, Sanxenxo, a settlement in the municipality of Sanxenxo, autonomous community of Galicia

See also
 Canela (disambiguation)